Psalm 75 is the 75th psalm of the Book of Psalms, beginning in English in the King James Version: "Unto thee, O God, do we give thanks". The Book of Psalms forms part of the Ketuvim section of the Hebrew Bible and part of the Christian Old Testament. In the slightly different numbering system of the Greek Septuagint version of the bible, and in its Latin translation, the Vulgate, this psalm is Psalm 74. In Latin, it is known as "Confitebimur tibi Deus". It is one of the psalms of Asaph.

This psalm forms a regular part of Jewish, Catholic, Lutheran, Anglican and other Protestant liturgies. The thought of giving thanks has often been set to music, including in works by Heinrich Schütz and Johann Sebastian Bach.

Background and themes
Attributed to Asaph, Psalm 75 continues the theme of Psalms 57, 58, and 59, which also begin with the words al tashcheth, "Do not destroy". The New King James Version refers to al tashcheth or "Do not destroy" as a musical setting. Like the previous psalms, Psalm 75 speaks of the Jews in exile, and praises God for preserving them.

The psalm references the word "horn" several times. According to Charles Spurgeon, the horn is a symbol of honor or strength, but when possessed by the arrogant, the horn is said to be "cut down" or humbled. While God rejects the horns of the haughty, he exalts the horns of the righteous. 

The Midrash Tehillim cites ten scriptural verses that mention horns to identify ten horns that God gave to the Israelites: the horns of Abraham, Isaac (the shofar or ram's horn), Moses, Samuel, Aaron, the Sanhedrin, Heman the Ezrahite, Jerusalem, the Jewish Messiah, and David in the future. When the Israelites sinned, these ten horns were removed from them and transferred to the wicked, as it is written, "Behold a fourth beast, dreadful and terrible, and it had ten horns". The Midrash teaches that as long as the horns of the wicked prevail, the horns of Israel will be cut off; but in future, when God elevates the horns of the righteous, the horns of the wicked will be cut off.

Text

Hebrew Bible version
Following is the Hebrew text of Psalm 75:

King James Version
 Unto thee, O God, do we give thanks, unto thee do we give thanks: for that thy name is near thy wondrous works declare. 
 When I shall receive the congregation I will judge uprightly. 
 The earth and all the inhabitants thereof are dissolved: I bear up the pillars of it. Selah. 
 I said unto the fools, Deal not foolishly: and to the wicked, Lift not up the horn: 
 Lift not up your horn on high: speak not with a stiff neck. 
 For promotion cometh neither from the east, nor from the west, nor from the south. 
 But God is the judge: he putteth down one, and setteth up another. 
 For in the hand of the  there is a cup, and the wine is red; it is full of mixture; and he poureth out of the same: but the dregs thereof, all the wicked of the earth shall wring them out, and drink them. 
 But I will declare for ever; I will sing praises to the God of Jacob. 
 All the horns of the wicked also will I cut off; but the horns of the righteous shall be exalted.

Verse 2
When I shall receive the congregation I will judge uprightly.
Amended to "the proper time" or "the appointed time" in the New International Version and New King James Version. The "appointed time" is "the proper moment foreordained in the Divine counsels and known to God".

Uses

Judaism
Psalm 75 is recited during the Motza'ei Shabbat prayers in the Sephardic tradition. In the Siddur Avodas Yisrael, Psalm 75 is said as the Song of the Day for Shabbat Torah reading Ki Tissa and Eikev. This psalm is also recited on the third through sixth days of Passover in some traditions.

Psalm 75 is recited as a "prayer for forgiveness".

Book of Common Prayer
In the Church of England's Book of Common Prayer, this psalm is appointed to be read on the morning of the 15th day of the month.

Musical settings 

Baroque composer Heinrich Schütz set Psalm 75 in German, "Aus unsers Herzen Grunde", for choir as part of his composition of the Becker Psalter, SWV 172. Johann Sebastian Bach used the beginning of Psalm 75 for the opening movement of Wir danken dir, Gott, wir danken dir, BWV 29, a cantata for the inauguration of a town council in Leipzig. He used the music again for the movement Gratias agimus tibi of the Mass in B minor, expressing the same thought of thanks.

Hymns based on Psalm 75 or specific verses include the popular "Now Thank We All Our God", Catherine Winkworth's translation of Rinkart's "Nun danket alle Gott". The German hymn and its English version inspired several settings, including some by Bach.

References

Sources

External links 

 
 
 Text of Psalm 75 according to the 1928 Psalter
 Psalms Chapter 75 text in Hebrew and English, mechon-mamre.org
 For the leader. Do not destroy! A psalm of Asaph; a song. / We thank you, God, we give thanks; text and footnotes, usccb.org United States Conference of Catholic Bishops
 Psalm 75:1 introduction and text, biblestudytools.com
 Psalm 75 – The Righteous Judge Exalts and Brings Low enduringword.com
 Psalm 75 / Refrain: God alone is judge. Church of England
 Psalm 75 at biblegateway.com

075